Jim Tanner is a sports and entertainment agent certified by both the National Basketball Players Association (NBPA) and the Women's National Basketball Players Association (WNBPA). Tanner is the founder and President of Tandem Sports + Entertainment, with clients including Tim Duncan, Ray Allen, Grant Hill, Tamika Catchings, Jeremy Lin, Thaddeus Young, Marvin Williams, and John Henson.
 
In 2006, Tanner was named to the Sports Business Journal and Washingtonian "40 Under 40" lists and he has twice been recognized by Sports Illustrated as one of the "101 Most Influential Minorities in Sports."

Background

As an undergraduate student, Tanner attended his home state University of North Carolina-Chapel Hill on a Morehead-Cain Scholarship - the first merit scholarship program established in the United States and one of the most selective at public universities today. After graduating with a B.A. in English Literature ('90), Tanner continued his education at the University of Chicago Law School ('93), where he studied under then-Professor, now President, Barack Obama.
 
Tanner began his legal career as a corporate and mergers-and-acquisitions lawyer with the Washington, D.C. office of Skadden, Arps, Slate, Meagher & Flom LLP. After four years, Tanner left the firm to work on the 1996 Bill Clinton election campaign.
 
After the election, Tanner was recruited by Williams & Connolly LLP to work alongside then-partner, Lon Babby. Between 1997 and 2010, Tanner and Babby led the Williams & Connolly sports law practice, representing athletes in the National Basketball Association (NBA) and Women's National Basketball Association (WNBA); PGA Tour golfer Tim Clark and LPGA golfer Perry Swenson; and Olympic gymnast Dominique Dawes. Between 2010, when Babby left the firm to become President of Basketball Operations for the Phoenix Suns, and 2013, Tanner was solely in charge of the basketball and entertainment practice, notably signing Jeremy Lin in the aftermath of "Linsanity.”
 
In 2013, Tanner left Williams & Connolly with his client base to establish Tandem Sports + Entertainment, joined by fellow Williams & Connolly attorney, Helen Dooley, and basketball, marketing, and public relations staff. Tandem incorporated the previously independent Meredith Communications, founded by Meredith Geisler, to lead the public relations department.

Since its launch, Tandem has expanded by Tanner's signing of veteran NBA players such as Jason Richardson, C.J. Watson, and Wayne Ellington, in addition to two rookie draft picks in 2014 (Thanasis Antetokounmpo and Jordan McRae). In 2015, Tandem Sports + Entertainment was named to the Washington Business Journal list of "Best Places to Work" in the D.C. region.

Personal life

Tanner lives in the Virginia suburbs of Washington D.C. with his wife (Alison), son (Evan), and daughter (Lauren). In addition to representing a number of former UNC basketball players, Tanner serves on the Morehead-Cain Scholarship Fund Board of Directors.

References

Skadden, Arps, Slate, Meagher & Flom people
American sports agents
Year of birth missing (living people)
Living people